McCurtain County is in the southeastern corner of the U.S. state of Oklahoma. As of the 2010 census, the population was 33,151. Its county seat is Idabel. It was formed at statehood from part of the earlier Choctaw Nation in Indian Territory. The name honors an influential Choctaw family that lived in the area. Green McCurtain was the last chief when Oklahoma became a state in 1907.

History
The area now included in McCurtain County was part of the Choctaw Nation before Oklahoma became a state. The territory of the present-day county fell within the Apukshunnubbee District, one of three administrative super-regions comprising the Choctaw Nation, and was divided among six of its counties: Bok Tuklo, Cedar, Eagle, Nashoba, Red River, and Towson counties.  Previously, In the 1820s, it was a major part of Miller County, Arkansas.

The area was sparsely populated, with no roads or bridges and no towns. Post offices were established at small trading posts along the various trails. Towns began to form when the Arkansas and Choctaw Railway (later the St. Louis and San Francisco Railway) was built across the area in 1902. Between 1910 and 1921 the Choctaw Lumber Company laid tracks for the Texas, Oklahoma and Eastern Railroad from Valliant, Oklahoma, to DeQueen, Arkansas. These roads still served the area at the beginning of the 21st century.

Initially, the county experienced difficulty functioning because of lack of funds. When the Choctaws accepted their land allotments, their homesteads were not taxable for twenty-one years. No roads were built until a decade after statehood. There were no bridges, so ferries carried people and vehicles across the major streams.

Beavers Bend State Park was opened in 1937, establishing the region as a tourism destination due to the variety of recreational activities it offers.

The only F5 tornado in April in Oklahoma occurred in this county on April 2, 1982.

Geography

McCurtain County's location in southeastern Oklahoma places it within a 10-county area designated for tourism purposes by the Oklahoma Department of Tourism and Recreation as Choctaw Country.

It is the third-largest county in Oklahoma by area. The terrain of McCurtain County varies from the foothills of the Ouachita Mountains in the northern part of the county, to the rich Red River bottoms of the southern part. Sections of the Mountain Fork and Little River drainages lie in McCurtain County. The Glover River originates in McCurtain County and flows  to its confluence with the Little River southeast of Wright City. Broken Bow Lake was created in 1968 by damming the Mountain Fork River; the River is one of the two year-round trout fisheries in the state. The lowest point in the state of Oklahoma is located on the Little River in McCurtain County, where it flows out of Oklahoma and into Arkansas. McCurtain County is the only documented part of Oklahoma, together with Choctaw County, located within the natural range of the American alligator.

The county also contains the McCurtain County Wilderness Area, a 14,087-acre tract created in 1918 and managed by the Oklahoma Department of Wildlife Conservation, and the Little River National Wildlife Refuge, which is managed by the U.S. Fish and Wildlife Service.

The county contains the location (Smithville) with the highest annual average precipitation in the state, at 55.71 inches.

Major highways
  U.S. Highway 70
  U.S. Highway 259
  State Highway 3
  State Highway 4
  State Highway 37
  State Highway 87
  State Highway 98

Adjacent counties

 Le Flore County (north)
 Polk County, Arkansas (northeast)
 Sevier County, Arkansas (east)
 Little River County, Arkansas (southeast)
 Bowie County, Texas (south)
 Red River County, Texas (southwest)
 Choctaw County (west)
 Pushmataha County (northwest)

National protected areas
 Little River National Wildlife Refuge
 Ouachita National Forest (part)

Demographics

At the 2000 census there were 34,402 people, 13,216 households, and 9,541 families in the county.  The population density was 7/km2 (19/mi2).  There were 15,427 housing units at an average density of 3/km2 (8/mi2).  The racial makup of the county was 70.54% White, 9.30% Black or African American, 13.57% Native American, 0.22% Asian, 0.01% Pacific Islander, 1.34% from other races, and 5.02% from two or more races.  3.09%. were Hispanic or Latino of any race. 28.6% were of American, 7.6% Irish and 5.9% English ancestry. 94.4% spoke English, 2.9% Spanish and 2.6% Choctaw as their first language.

Of the 13,216 households 34.00% had children under the age of 18 living with them, 53.30% were married couples living together, 14.60% had a female householder with no husband present, and 27.80% were non-families. 25.40% of households were one person and 11.00% were one person aged 65 or older.  The average household size was 2.56 and the average family size was 3.06.

The age distribution was 28.20% under the age of 18, 8.30% from 18 to 24, 26.20% from 25 to 44, 23.40% from 45 to 64, and 14.00% 65 or older.  The median age was 36 years. For every 100 females there were 92.80 males.  For every 100 females age 18 and over, there were 89.10 males.

The median household income was $24,162 and the median family income  was $29,933. Males had a median income of $26,528 versus $17,869 for females. The per capita income for the county was $13,693.  About 21.00% of families and 24.70% of the population were below the poverty line, including 32.40% of those under age 18 and 21.20% of those age 65 or over.

Politics

Economy
Agriculture and forestry have dominated the county's economy. The dense forests that originally covered the area were cleared and processed within two decades after statehood. The cleared lands then became subsistence farms. Cotton was the main money crop, until the cotton market collapsed during the Great Depression. Cattle raising, as well as production of swine and poultry, replaced cotton farming in importance. Cotton farms in the Red River valley began raising grains and forage instead.

Natural reseeding and active reforestation projects, both public and private, have replenished much of the harvested forest area. This revitalized the timber industry, which is again important to the county economy.

Limestone, sand and gravel are extracted for extensive local use.

Communities

Cities
 Broken Bow
 Idabel (county seat)

Towns
 Garvin
 Haworth
 Hochatown
 Millerton
 Smithville
 Valliant
 Wright City

Census-designated place
 Eagletown

Other unincorporated communities

 Battiest
 Bethel
 Bokhoma
 Glover
 Pickens
 Ringold
 Rufe
 Sherwood
 Tom
 Watson

Notable people

 Harry Rossoll, creator of Smokey Bear and artist for the Forest Heritage Center diorama exhibits

See also
 National Register of Historic Places listings in McCurtain County, Oklahoma

References

External links
 McCurtain County Tourism Authority
 McCurtain County OSU Extension Center
 Beavers Bend Cabins near Broken Bow Lake and Beavers Bend State Park
 Oklahoma Digital Maps: Digital Collections of Oklahoma and Indian Territory

 
1907 establishments in Oklahoma
Populated places established in 1907